Carboceric acid, or heptacosanoic acid or heptacosylic acid, is a 27-carbon long-chain saturated fatty acid with the chemical formula . Its name derives from a combination of the word "Carbon" and κηρός (Keros), meaning beeswax or honeycomb in Ancient Greek, since the acid can be found in the mineral ozokerite, also known as ozocerite.

See also
List of saturated fatty acids
Very long chain fatty acids
List of carboxylic acids

Fatty acids
Alkanoic acids